"Worthing Inn" is a short story by Orson Scott Card.  It only appears in his short story collection The Worthing Saga.

Plot summary
Little Peter lives in the Worthing Inn with his immediate family and his uncle Elijah.  While he was still a little boy, he discovered that he could hear the thoughts of everyone around him, all except his uncle.  Although he is unable to read his uncle's thoughts, Peter can sometimes feel hatred coming from Elijah.  As a result, he starts to hate and fear his uncle.  One day, when Peter stumbles on a wasp nest and gets stung, he discovers that he can kill the wasps with his mind.  That night, he tries to kill his uncle using the same power, but discovers that his uncle is more powerful than he is.  Elijah hurts Peter to teach him a lesson and then tells him to never use his power again.  At first, Peter stops using the power because he is afraid of his uncle, but as he grows older and becomes a man, he restrains himself out of love and respect for Elijah.

Connection to the Worthing Saga
This story takes place several years after the events in the story "Worthing Farm".  Orson Scott Card wrote a very different version of this story in chapter 10 of his novel The Worthing Chronicle. In the previous version, Elijah has two children: one of them, Adam, is the one child with telepathic powers, while Elijah's innkeeper brother, Mathew, has the gift to shut his mind to telepathy. One night, while Adam tortured the citizens of the small town of Worthing, Elijah tried to stop his son and Adam attacked him. Mathew eventually saves Elijah from his own son, who flees to another city, where he begins a political career using his gift to manipulate and blackmail others.
The cruelty of Little Peter as a child and adult despot (Adam in Worthing Saga), and his later redemption at old age are very similar to Peter Wiggin's, the Hegemon from Ender's Game.

See also
List of works by Orson Scott Card

External links
 The official Orson Scott Card website

Short stories by Orson Scott Card
1990 short stories